Boulenger's tree skink (Brachyseps frontoparietalis) is a species of skink endemic to Madagascar.

References

Reptiles of Madagascar
Reptiles described in 1889
Brachyseps
Taxa named by George Albert Boulenger